"Science of Silence" is a song by English singer-songwriter Richard Ashcroft and is the sixth track on his 2002 album Human Conditions. The song was also released on 6 January 2003 as the second single from that album in the United Kingdom (see 2003 in British music). The single peaked at No. 14 in the UK Singles Chart.

Track listings
 7" HUT163
 "Science of Silence" (single edit) – 3:53
 "Get Up Now" – 4:17
 CD HUTCD163
 "Science of Silence" (single edit) – 3:53
 "Get Up Now" – 4:17
 "Check the Meaning" (The Freelance Hellraiser Remix) – 4:06
 "Science of Silence" (video)
 DVD HUTDVD163
 "Science of Silence" (album version)
 "Science of Silence" (video/live performance)
 "Bright Lights" (film footage)

2002 songs
2003 singles
Richard Ashcroft songs
Hut Records singles
Song recordings produced by Chris Potter (record producer)
Songs written by Richard Ashcroft